Wonder No.8 is the debut and only studio album by British girl group Honeyz. It was first released on 23 November 1998 and then re-released with extra tracks on 1 November 1999.

Three singles were lifted from the original version with founding member Heavenli Abdi ("Finally Found", "End of the Line" and "Love of a Lifetime") and two more from the re-released version with new member Mariama Goodman ("Never Let You Down" and "Won't Take It Lying Down"). All five singles reached the top ten of the UK Singles Chart, whilst the album was certified gold.

Track listing

Standard version

Re-released version
"Finally Found" – 4:49
"Never Let You Down" – 3:33
"Won't Take It Lying Down" – 4:13
"Do Me Baby" – 3:47
"Keep Me Hanging On" – 3:32
"Love of a Lifetime" (Rude Boy Mix) – 3:51
"Just Let Go" – 4:52
"In the Street" (Ignorants Mix) – 5:27
"Seems Like" – 3:57
"Good Love" – 3:23
"Somebody to Love Me" – 4:28
"Summertime" – 3:51
"Wonder No. 8" – 4:45
"What Does She Look Like?" – 4:38
"End of the Line" (Rude Boy Mix) – 5:00
 The re-released version includes videos for "Finally Found", "End of the Line", and "Never Let You Down." It also removes the hidden interlude at the start of "Just Let Go."

Charts

Certifications

References

1999 debut albums
Honeyz albums
Mercury Records albums
Albums produced by Steve Levine
Albums produced by Simon Climie